Isaac Donkor (born 16 November 1991, in Sekondi-Takoradi) is a Ghanaian football player.

Career
Donkor is a latest addition to the Liberty squad signing from Sekondi Hasaacas F.C. in summer 2008. The four except Donkor have been part of Liberty's squad for the just ended season and have had an impressive tournament ahead of the start of the season. In September 2009 left Liberty and signed for Aduana Stars, before joined only three months later to league rival Heart of Lions F.C. Donkor played for Heart of Lions, until June 2012 and returned than to his former club Sekondi Hasaacas F.C. He was released by his club Sekondi Hasaacas F.C. in July 2013.

Qualities

International career
He played for U-17 Ghana national team in 2007 FIFA U-17 World Cup in Korea Republic, he was one of the goalgetter and his goal against Brazil brought him the nickname Giant Killer.

References

1991 births
Living people
Ghanaian footballers
Liberty Professionals F.C. players
Association football forwards
Sekondi Hasaacas F.C. players
Association football midfielders
Heart of Lions F.C. players
Aduana Stars F.C. players